Minas de Matahambre is a municipality and town in the Pinar del Río Province of Cuba. It was declared a National Monument of Cuba.

Geography
The municipality faces the Gulf of Mexico to the north, where the cays of the Colorados Archipelago are developed off-shore. It is bordered by the municipalities of Mantua, Guane, San Juan y Martínez and Viñales.

The municipality includes the villages of Baja, Cabezas, Pons, La Sabana, Río del Medio, Santa Lucía, Sitio Morales and Sumidero.

Demographics
In 2004, the municipality of Minas de Matahambre had a population of 34,419.

Culture
The Minas de Matahambre Municipal Museum holds objects and photography collections of local history.

See also
Municipalities of Cuba
List of cities in Cuba

References

External links

Populated places in Pinar del Río Province